Regina Elena may refer to

Queen Elena of Italy
The Premio Regina Elena, an Italian flat race for horses
Regina Elena, an Italian barque launched in 1903
Regina Elena, an Italian battleship launched in 1904.